Kenneth Kimberlin Brimer Jr., known as Kim Brimer (born 5 March 1945), 
is a Republican former member of the Texas State Senate from Fort Worth, Texas. He represented District 10. He was the only GOP member of the 31-member chamber to have been defeated in the general election held on November 4, 2008, when he lost to Democrat Wendy R. Davis of Fort Worth, her party's 2014 nominee for governor against Republican Greg Abbott.

Brimer also served for seven terms in the Texas House of Representatives from 1989 to 2003. In the 2000 primary, he defeated a challenge from Bill Zedler, a medical consultant from Fort Worth. Brimer polled 5,472 votes (55 percent) to Bill Zedler's 4,461 (45 percent). In 2002, Zedler won the House seat that Brimer vacated to move on to the state Senate.

Brimer was born in Houston to Kenneth Brimer Sr., and the former Louie Francis Hughes 
and earned a B.S. degree in Business Administration from Stephen F. Austin State University in Nacogdoches, Texas.

In July 2005, Texas Monthly magazine, in its article "The Best and Worst Legislators of 2005," awarded Brimer an "Honorable Mention" for his resolution of the Senate deadlock over taxes.

Brimer is a cousin of actor Trey Wilson.

Most recent election

2008

Previous elections

2004

2002

References

External links
Senate of Texas - Senator Kim Brimer official TX Senate website
Project Vote Smart - Senator Kenneth 'Kim' Brimer (TX) profile

1945 births
Living people
People from Houston
Stephen F. Austin State University alumni
Republican Party Texas state senators
Republican Party members of the Texas House of Representatives
People from Fort Worth, Texas
21st-century American politicians